Stephen Craig Walsh (born 17 December 1960) is a retired male long jumper from New Zealand. He competed in the 1982 Commonwealth Games winning bronze, and in 1984 Summer Olympic Games. He won the New Zealand national men's long jump title in seven consecutive years, from 1980 to 1986.

Walsh was born in Dunedin on 17 December 1960, and educated at Otago Boys' High School. He went on to study at Auckland Technical Institute from 1981 to 1983, gaining a Diploma of Physiotherapy, and the University of Otago from 1987 to 1991, graduating MB ChB. Between 1984 and 1986, he worked as a physiotherapist at Dunedin Hospital, and after completing his medical studies he worked in general practice. In 1993, Walsh married Vivien Binney.

References 

1960 births
Living people
Athletes from Dunedin
People educated at Otago Boys' High School
Auckland University of Technology alumni
University of Otago alumni
Athletes (track and field) at the 1982 Commonwealth Games
Athletes (track and field) at the 1984 Summer Olympics
Commonwealth Games bronze medallists for New Zealand
New Zealand male long jumpers
Commonwealth Games medallists in athletics
Olympic athletes of New Zealand
Medallists at the 1982 Commonwealth Games